Zofia Kiełpińska (born 15 May 1960 as Topór-Huciańska) is a Polish biathlete. She competed at the 1992 Winter Olympics and the 1994 Winter Olympics. She works in Zakopane Council.

References

1960 births
Living people
Biathletes at the 1992 Winter Olympics
Biathletes at the 1994 Winter Olympics
Polish female biathletes
Olympic biathletes of Poland
Sportspeople from Zakopane
20th-century Polish women